Trajano de Moraes is a municipality located in the Brazilian state of Rio de Janeiro. It is located in the mountain region of northern Rio de Janeiro state at 22º03'48" south latitude and 42º03'59" west longitude, altitude .

References

Municipalities in Rio de Janeiro (state)